Julius Walter Atwood (June 27, 1857 – April 10, 1945) was missionary bishop of the Episcopal Diocese of Arizona from 1911 to 1925. Note that the Diocese of Arizona was the Missionary District of Arizona until 1959.

Early life and education
Atwood was born on June 27, 1857, in Salisbury, Vermont, son of Frank Carley Atwood and Sarah Thomas. He was educated at the public schools and then later at Middlebury College from where he received his Bachelor of Arts in 1878. Later he studied at the General Theological Seminary for two years but continued his studies at the Episcopal Theological School in Cambridge, Massachusetts. He graduated with a Bachelor of Divinity in 1882 and received a Master of Arts from Middlebury College that same year.

Ordination and career
Atwood was ordained deacon in 1882 and priest the following year by Bishop Benjamin Henry Paddock of Massachusetts. He served as rector of the Church of the Ascension in Ipswich, Massachusetts between 1882 and 1887. Later he became rector of St John's Church in Providence, Rhode Island and in 1894 he became rector of Trinity Church in Columbus, Ohio. From 1906 till 1911 he served as rector of Trinity Church in Phoenix, Arizona. He was also the Archdeacon of Arizona from 1907 till 1911. In 1910 he also served as deputy to the General Convention.

Bishop
Atwood was elected Missionary Bishop of Arizona in 1910 and was consecrated on January 18, 1911, by Bishop William Lawrence of Massachusetts. He retained the post till 1925 when he resigned as missionary bishop. Later he served as Assistant Bishop in Pennsylvania, Massachusetts, Western Massachusetts and Connecticut. Bishop Atwood was also the author of numerous works and a lecturer of Church History at Kenyon College and Sewanee: The University of the South. He died on April 10, 1945, in Washington D.C.

Family
Atwood married Anna Richmond in 1895 and together had two daughters. Ellen and Betty Atwood.

References 

 Elizabeth Hatch, The Friendly Bishop: Julius Walter Atwood, 1857–1945 (1968)

1857 births
1945 deaths
American Episcopalians
Episcopal bishops of Arizona